Upper Bighouse is a remote linear crofting township, which lies on the west bank of the Halladale River in the former county of Sutherland. It is now in the Highland council area.

Upper Bighouse is located 4 miles south of Melvich.

References

Populated places in Sutherland
Upper Bighouse